Mutiara Rahma Putri is an Indonesian rower. She earned a bronze medal at lightweight double sculls events at the 2019 Southeast Asian Games which was held in the Philippines.

References

External links
 FISA athlete profile

2004 births
Living people
Indonesian female rowers
Sportspeople from Jambi
Rowers at the 2020 Summer Olympics
Southeast Asian Games medalists in rowing
Southeast Asian Games bronze medalists for Indonesia
Southeast Asian Games silver medalists for Indonesia
21st-century Indonesian women